Niabella yanshanensis is a Gram-negative, aerobic and non-motile bacterium from the genus of Niabella which has been isolated from the rhizosphere of a soybean plant from Hebei in China.

References

External links
Type strain of Niabella yanshanensis at BacDive -  the Bacterial Diversity Metadatabase

Chitinophagia
Bacteria described in 2009